Rostand Barry Melaping Tchassem (born 14 August 1978) is a Cameroonian judoka.

Achievements

References

1978 births
Living people
Cameroonian male judoka
Judoka at the 2004 Summer Olympics
Olympic judoka of Cameroon
Commonwealth Games bronze medallists for Cameroon
Judoka at the 2002 Commonwealth Games
Commonwealth Games medallists in judo
20th-century Cameroonian people
21st-century Cameroonian people
Medallists at the 2002 Commonwealth Games